Gusripen Efendi (born August 14, 1986 in Muara Mahat, Kampar Regency) is an Indonesian footballer who currently plays for PSPS Pekanbaru in the Indonesia Super League.

Club statistics

References

External links

1986 births
Association football midfielders
Living people
Sportspeople from Riau
Indonesian footballers
Liga 1 (Indonesia) players
PSPS Pekanbaru players
Semen Padang F.C. players
Indonesian Premier Division players